This article shows the rosters of all participating teams at the women's Volleyball tournament at the 2015 Pan American Games in Toronto. Rosters can have a maximum of 12 athletes.

The Argentina indoor volleyball women's team consists of the following players:

Brazil announced their squad on July 9, 2015.

Canada announced their squad on June 18, 2015.

The Cuban indoor volleyball women's team consists of the following players:

The Dominican Republic indoor volleyball women's team consists of the following players:

The Peruvian indoor volleyball women's team consists of the following players:

Puerto Rico participated with the following squad:

The United States announced their squad on July 16, 2015.

References

Volleyball at the 2015 Pan American Games
Women's events at the 2015 Pan American Games
Pan